The Discomfort of Evening is the debut novel by Dutch writer Marieke Lucas Rijneveld, published in 2018. On 26 August 2020, Rijneveld became the first Dutch writer to win the £50,000 International Booker Prize, shared jointly with the novel's English translator Michele Hutchison.

Summary 
The Discomfort of Evening concerns the life of ten-year old Jas, a Dutch girl who lives with her Reformed family on a dairy farm in the Netherlands. Jas is grieving the death of her brother Matthies, who died accidentally in an ice skating accident. His death drives further instability in the family and deteriorates Jas' mental health.

Background 
The novel became a bestseller upon its release in the Netherlands. It has been the subject of controversy due to its graphic depictions of animal abuse and adolescent sexuality. It was first published on 31 January 2018 by Atlas Contact in the Netherlands. It was translated into English by Michele Hutchison and first published on 5 March 2020 as The Discomfort of Evening by Faber and Faber in the United Kingdom. Hutchison's translation was later published in the United States by Graywolf Press on 18 August 2020.

Reception 
According to book review aggregator website Book Marks, The Discomfort of Evening received mostly favourable reviews. From the 22 reviews collected, 11 were classified as "rave", 4 as "positive", 6 as "mixed" and 1 as "pan".

In its starred review, Kirkus Reviews wrote, "Rijneveld's extraordinary narrator describes a small world of pain which is hard to look at and harder to ignore." Publishers Weekly wrote, "Like a scene in a Bosch painting, the macabre material is loaded with sexual transgressions, pedophilia, animal torture, and abuse. The onslaught can be numbing, but the translation's soaring lyricism offers mercy for the reader."

References 

2018 novels
2018 debut novels
21st-century Dutch novels
Dutch-language novels
Novels set in the Netherlands
Farms in fiction
Grief in fiction